
Year 279 (CCLXXIX) was a common year starting on Wednesday (link will display the full calendar) of the Julian calendar. At the time, it was known as the Year of the Consulship of Probus and Paternus (or, less frequently, year 1032 Ab urbe condita). The denomination 279 for this year has been used since the early medieval period, when the Anno Domini calendar era became the prevalent method in Europe for naming years.

Events 
 By place 
 Roman Empire 
 Emperor Probus defeats the Burgundians and Vandals, in Raetia and Pannonia (modern Switzerland and Hungary).

 Asia 
 Winter – Conquest of Wu by Jin: The Jin Dynasty conquers Eastern Wu, the last of the three contending powers in China during the Three Kingdoms Period.

Births 
 Sima Ying, Chinese prince of the Jin Dynasty (d. 306)

Deaths 
 Johanan bar Nappaha, Jewish compiler of the Talmud
 Tiberius Julius Teiranes, Roman prince and client king
 Tufa Shujineng, Chinese chieftain of Jin Dynasty

References